Robert Charles Sweikert (May 20, 1926 – June 17, 1956) was an American racing driver, best known as the winner of the 1955 Indianapolis 500 and the 1955 National Championship, as well as the 1955 Midwest Sprint car championship - the only driver in history to sweep all three in a single season.

Sweikert was born in Los Angeles, California.  His "Indy 500" win was over-shadowed by the fatal crash of two-time winner Bill Vukovich during the race earlier that day. Sweikert finished sixth at Indianapolis the following May, but then died weeks later, at age 30, in 1956 after crashing a Sprint car at Salem Speedway.

Personal life

Bob Sweikert grew up in pre-war Los Angeles. His mother had married his stepfather, an electrician for the state of California, when Bob was an infant. Bob was raised through his early teen years with his older stepbrother, Ed, who enlisted in the US Navy, and then soon died in 1942, at the onset of World War II. That year the family moved briefly to San Francisco, then across the bay to the rural town of Hayward, California. There in high school Bob met his future wife, Dorie.

From age 16 Sweikert worked after school as a mechanic at the local Ford dealership in Hayward. A naturally gifted mechanic, he frequently won street races throughout the East Bay. One of his frequent local competitors on the streets was Ed Elisian, a teenage boy from nearby Oakland, California. A dozen years later, Elisian and Sweikert were engaged in the racing duel that led to Sweikert's fatal crash at Salem Speedway.

In late 1944, Sweikert enrolled in the US Army Air Force, but suffered a severe knee injury while training at Lowry Field in Colorado. With months to heal and the war over, he was honorably discharged in September 1945.

In 1947, Sweikert met his first wife, Marion Edwards, at a party at UCLA.   During 1947 Sweikert began mailing monthly accounts of his life to Veda Orr, through April 1956. Karl & Veda Orr built & operated their own race cars. Veda wrote many racing articles.

Sweikert returned to Hayward and opened his own small business, Sweikert Automotive, an automotive repair shop based out of his parents' garage. There over the next couple years, he built his own track roadster. On Memorial Day, May 26, 1947 Sweikert ran his first race for prize money at the Oakland Speedway, and finished second.

Sweikert then quit automotive repair and became a full-time driver. He gained his first racing sponsorship in July 1947, when he became a track roadster race driver for Hubbard Auto Parts of Oakland.

In early 1948, he married  Marion Edwards. They had a large family wedding in West L.A.  The same year, Sweikert moved up to midget cars, and won his first training race with the Bay Cities Racing Association. He ran seventy-two races that first BCRA season, finishing 14th out of 130 active members in the annual point standings.

In late 1952 his first wife, Marion, started divorce proceedings.  Sweikert fought for custody of their young daughter. Sweikert's mother, Grace, often visited Bob's firstborn until Grace died.

In January 1953, Sweikert married his high school sweetheart, divorcee Dorie with her two children, with whom he had recently become reacquainted. They settled in Indiana, to be close to the Speedway where Sweikert hoped to race and win.

Racing career
On February 12, 1949 Sweikert won the first BCRA Indoor Midget Race Track championship, in Oakland, on the new 1/12 mile oval track.

Sweikert's first chance at driving a Sprint car came next in 1949. He drove in northern California that year and later in Los Angeles.

After 1949 Sweikert became close friends with Johnny Boyd of Fresno, California when he met him on the California racing circuit. The two often raced together, and Boyd qualified for entry in the 1955 Indianapolis 500 when Sweikert helped him overcome mechanical handling problems in Boyd's car.

In May 1952, Sweikert ran his first "Indy 500" race. He entered at the 32nd starting position and ran for 77 laps in the McNamara Special car.

On September 12, 1953 Sweikert became the first driver ever to break  on a one-mile (1.6 km) oval track, at the Eastern Speed Dome, Syracuse, New York.

On September 26, 1953 Sweikert won the Hoosier Hundred, at the Indiana State Fairgrounds, a race which is chronicled by many as "the greatest race ever" run.

On September 11, 1954 Sweikert became the first driver ever to average  in a  race, with his win in the Lutes Truck Parts Special #17 car at the Eastern Speed Dome in Syracuse.

On May 30, 1955 Sweikert finally won the Indianapolis 500 race, from the 14th starting position in the Zink Kurtis roadster #6. That car now resides in the Museum at the Indianapolis racetrack. In the winner's circle, Sweikert and Dorie celebrated with singer-actress Dinah Shore.

In September 1955 Sweikert became the only driver in history to win the original American motor sports Triple Crown, by sweeping the Indianapolis 500, the AAA big car National Championship, and the Midwest sprint car championship.

In May 1956, at his final return to the Indianapolis 500, Sweikert began in the 10th starting position and came in for a 6th-place finish, with the team's D-A Lubricant roadster.

Death
Weeks later, Sweikert's fatal sprint car crash occurred on June 17, 1956, at Salem Speedway. While completing the third lap, Sweikert was running near the outside wall in 4th place, side by side with his past teenage East Bay streets rival, Ed Elisian, in 5th. Coming out of the 4th turn, the two cars started down the straightaway in front of the grandstand. Running close to the wall, Sweikert's right rear wheel clipped a steel beam sticking out onto the track from the wall at the end of the stands. The sprint car flew over the edge of the track, down the embankment, and landed a hundred feet below, where it briefly burst into flames. Sweikert was pronounced dead upon arrival at Washington County Hospital.

He is buried at Lone Tree Cemetery in Fairview, California.

World Championship career summary
The Indianapolis 500 was part of the FIA World Championship from 1950 through 1960. Drivers competing at Indy during those years were credited with World Championship points and participation. Bob Sweikert participated in 5 World Championship races. He won 1 race and accumulated a total of 8 championship points.  He is tied with Pat Flaherty for the record of the driver with the fewest points to have won a race.

Complete AAA Championship Car results

Indianapolis 500 results

Awards
January 1956 - inducted into Hoosier Auto Racing Fan Club Hall of Fame
May 28, 1956 - cover photo on Sports Illustrated
1993 - inducted into Motoring Press Association Hall of Fame in San Francisco
May 1994 - inducted into Indianapolis Motor Speedway Hall of Fame
 1995 - inducted in the National Sprint Car Hall of Fame, Knoxville, Iowa
He was inducted into the Motorsports Hall of Fame of America in 2016.

References

1926 births
1956 deaths
Champ Car champions
Indianapolis 500 drivers
Indianapolis 500 winners
Racing drivers who died while racing
American racing drivers
American people of German descent
National Sprint Car Hall of Fame inductees
Sports deaths in Indiana
Sportspeople from Hayward, California
Burials at Lone Tree Cemetery (Fairview, California)
Racing drivers from California
Racing drivers from Los Angeles
AAA Championship Car drivers
Formula One race winners